This is the discography of the South Korean rock band MC the Max. MC the Max have been in the music business ever since debuting in May 2000, under the name Moon Child before changing its group name to its current one in 2002.

Albums

Studio albums

Live albums

Compilation albums

Special albums

Singles

Soundtrack appearances

Other charted songs

References

Discographies of South Korean artists
K-pop music group discographies
Rock music group discographies